Begonia rheifolia  is a species of plant in the family Begoniaceae. It is endemic to Pahang in Peninsular Malaysia.

References

rheifolia 
Flora of Peninsular Malaysia